The following elections occurred in the year 1971.

Africa
 1971 Liberian general election
 1971 Malawian general election
 1971 Mauritanian general election

Asia
 1971 Indonesian legislative election
 1971 Iranian legislative election
 1971 Kuwaiti general election
 1971 Nepalese Rastriya Panchayat election
 1971 Philippine Senate election

India
 1971 Indian general election
 1951–1971 Indian general elections
 Indian general election in Andhra Pradesh, 1971
 Indian general election in Tamil Nadu, 1971
 1971 Tamil Nadu legislative assembly election

Australia
 1971 New South Wales state election
 1971 Western Australian state election

Europe
 1971 Belgian general election
 1971 Danish parliamentary election
 1971 Dutch general election
 1971 Icelandic parliamentary election
 1971 Maltese general election
 1971 Norwegian local elections

Austria
 1971 Austrian legislative election

France
 1971 French municipal elections

Germany
 1971 Rhineland-Palatinate state election

United Kingdom
 1971 Liverpool Scotland by-election
 1971 Macclesfield by-election
 1971 Southampton Itchen by-election
 1971 Ulster Unionist Party leadership election
 1971 Widnes by-election

United Kingdom local

English local
 1971 Lambeth Council election
 1971 Lewisham Council election
 1971 Newham Council election
 1971 Southwark Council election

North America
 1971 Honduran general election

Canada
 1971 Alberta general election
 1971 Edmonton municipal election
 1971 New Democratic Party leadership election
 1971 Newfoundland general election
 1971 Ontario general election
 1971 Progressive Conservative Party of Ontario leadership election
 1971 Saskatchewan general election

Caribbean
 1971 Antigua and Barbuda general election
 1971 Barbadian general election
 1971 Haitian referendum
 1971 Trinidad and Tobago general election

United States

Louisiana
 1971–72 Louisiana gubernatorial election

South Carolina
 1971 South Carolina's 1st congressional district special election

United States House of Representatives
 1971 South Carolina's 1st congressional district special election

Oceania

Australia
 1971 New South Wales state election
 1971 Western Australian state election

South America

Falkland Islands
 1971 Falkland Islands general election

See also

 
1971
Elections